Auto Bild Suomi is a biweekly magazine with a special focus on automobiles which is the Finnish edition of German magazine Auto Bild. It was started by Sanoma Magazines Finland in 2003, and the first issue appeared on 12 March 2004. The frequency of the magazine is biweekly, and it targets men aged 18-49. The magazine offers information on buying and using a car and features articles on test drives and comparisons of the new car models. 

In 2005 Auto Bild Suomi was acquired by Fokus Media Finland based in Helsinki. The editor-in-chief of the magazine is Pekka Kaidesoja.

References

External links

2003 establishments in Germany
Automobile magazines published in Finland
Biweekly magazines
Finnish-language magazines
Magazines established in 2003
Magazines published in Helsinki